United States presidential elections in Pennsylvania occur when voters in the U.S. Commonwealth of Pennsylvania cast ballots for electors to the Electoral College as part of a national election to elect the President and Vice President of the United States. Regularly scheduled general elections occur on Election Day, coinciding with elections in the other 49 states and the District of Columbia.

As in other states in the U.S., presidential elections are indirect elections. Voters do not cast ballots directly for a presidential candidate, but rather a slate of electors pledged to support that candidate, with the victorious slate of electors casting their ballots directly for President and Vice President of the United States as part of the Electoral College. During the first presidential election in 1789, Pennsylvania was allotted 15 electoral votes. In 2016, the most recent election, the state was allotted 20. This number, proportional to the state's population and decided every 10 years after a census, peaked at 38 from the 1912 election through the 1928 election. The next presidential election in Pennsylvania, coinciding with the national election, is scheduled for November 5, 2024.

The list below contains election returns from all 59 quadrennial presidential elections in Pennsylvania, beginning with the first in 1789 and ending with the most recent in 2020. Incumbent Presidents are listed as well as presidential candidates who carried Pennsylvania and runner(s)-up in the state, including major third-party candidates (garnering 5% or more of the popular vote). Bold indicates the candidate who won the election nationally. Parties are color-coded to the left of a President's or candidate's name according to the key below. The popular vote and percentage margins listed in the "Margin" column are the differences between the total votes received and percentage of the popular vote received by the top two finishers in the corresponding election (i.e. the margin-of-victory of a candidate who carried Pennsylvania over the nearest competitor). The "E.V." section denotes the number of electoral votes cast in favor of the candidate who carried the state, which has been unanimous except for two occasions—1796 and 1800—in which the number in parentheses represents the number of votes cast for the runner-up.

In all, the Republican Party has carried Pennsylvania in 26 presidential elections, the Democratic Party in 20, the Democratic-Republican Party in 8, the Whig Party in 2, and the Progressive Party in 1 (1912). A nonpartisan candidate, George Washington, carried the state twice (in 1789 and 1792). Pennsylvania has voted for the overall victor in 48 of 59 elections (81.4% of the time).

List of elections

 Parties

Note: Bold candidate indicates President elected nationally.

See also
 Elections in Pennsylvania
 List of United States Senate elections in Pennsylvania
 List of Pennsylvania gubernatorial elections

Notes

References

External links
Pennsylvania Department of State Election Returns Portal
Pennsylvania Presidential Election Returns (1789-2004) from the Wilkes University Election Statistics Project

Presidential